Tornike Rijvadze (transliterated as Rijvadze; born 25 March 1989) is a Georgian politician and a former business executive. On 21 July 2018, he was elected and serves as Chairman of the Government of the Autonomous Republic of Ajara. Rijvadze was nominated by the ruling Georgian Dream-Democratic Georgia party. As the youngest Chairman in the history of Ajara Autonomous Republic, his nomination was approved by the 21-member legislature of Ajara. He had previously served as a deputy Minister of Energy of Georgia (2017) and, afterward as a director of a state-owned JSC "Georgian Energy Development Fund".

Education and early career 
Born in the town of Khulo, Rijvadze graduated from the Tbilisi State University with a degree in law in 2011. He holds MIB from Batumi State University (2014), LL.M from the City, University of London (2013). Before taking up the public duties, he held the Legal Director and General Counsel position at the biggest hydropower project development in Georgia worth USD 500 million. He has also held management-level positions in venture-backed start-up, intergovernmental and development organizations.

Chairman of the Government of Adjara 
Rijvadze led the region through three elections (presidential, parliamentary and municipal) resulting in the victory of the Georgian Dream party.

Tornike Rijvadze increased sponsorship of social programs for those dealing with health issues. Thus providing citizens of the region with extra funding and support for their medical expenses. The most outstanding example of solving social issues includes an unprecedented decision – to build houses for families living in a life-threatening environment in a self-made settlement, where more than 1000 children do not have proper living conditions. 

Rijvadze supports economic diversification. In the past two years, 2 industrial zones have been established in 2 different municipalities.  First Zone has already attracted 16 investment projects within a year. Totally, the zone will create 1500 jobs and will attract around 75 million GEL private investments, while the second Industrial Zone will create around 1000 jobs and 40 million GEL investments.

Significant efforts have been also made to diversify one of the leading sectors in the Ajara Region - Tourism. The policy is focused on creating all possibilities for developing Sports tourism, MICE tourism, Eco end Ethno tourism.

In parallel with these developments, Ajara Autonomous Republic continued to pursue international recognition, including the awards of Europe’s Leading Emerging Tourism Destination and the European City of Sport. The region hosted the President of the European Council Donald Tusk, held the NATO and PABSEC events, as well as Chess Olympiad and European Weightlifting Championship.

References 

Heads of Government of Adjara
1989 births
Living people
21st-century politicians from Georgia (country)
People from Khulo
Tbilisi State University alumni